Vestby Idrettslag is a Norwegian sports club from Vestby, Akershus. It has sections for association football, track and field, Nordic skiing and amateur boxing.

It was founded on 4 June 1917. In 1940 Vestby IF merged with the AIF club Vestby AIL to form Vestby IL.

The men's football team currently plays in the Third Division, the fourth tier of football in Norway. It last played in the Third Division (fourth tier) in 1997. However, the club also contributed to the umbrella team HSV Fotball (Hølen, Son og Vestby Fotball) which plays in the Fourth Division.

References

 Official site 

Football clubs in Norway
Athletics clubs in Norway
Sport in Akershus
Vestby
Sports clubs established in 1917
1917 establishments in Norway